Petre Chirculescu (1 October 1898 – 1975) was a Romanian equestrian. He competed in the individual eventing at the 1936 Summer Olympics.

References

1898 births
1975 deaths
Romanian male equestrians
Olympic equestrians of Romania
Equestrians at the 1936 Summer Olympics
People from Lugoj